Davaoeño, Davaweño, Davawenyo or Dabawenyo may refer to:

the permanent residents of the Davao Region,
the Davaoeño language.